This is a list of settlements located along the River Drin, its tributaries, and its distributaries. This includes the following rivers:
The Drin in northern Albania.
The White Drin in Kosovo and northern Albania, a tributary of the Drin.
The tributaries of the White Drin, namely Peć River (including the Haxhaj River, Čakorski Stream, Meteški Stream and Bjeluha River), Deçan River, Prue Stream, Erenik, Istok River (including the Kujafq River), Klina River, Mirusha River, Rimnik River, Toplluhë River, and Prizren River.
The Black Drin, a tributary of the Drin.
The tributaries of the Black Drin, namely the Zalli River, Perroi i Moglicës, Perroi i Borovës, Perroi i Maqellarës, Perroi i Grazhdanit, Perroi i Herebelit, Perroi i Erebarës, Perroi i Gjurasit, Perroi i Melanit, Perroi i Llixhave, Perroi i Bahutës, Perroi i Vilës, Malla River and Perroi i Bushtricës.
Debar Lake, formed by the damming of the Black Drin.
The Great Drin (Albanian: Drini i Madhë), the section of the Drin that diverges into the Bojana.
The Bojana river (Albanian: Buna), a distributary of the Drin.

The list will start from the source of each river and end at the mouth. Major settlements (population of 1,000 or greater) are highlighted in bold.

White Drin (Kosovo and Albania)

Black Drin and tributaries (Macedonia and Albania)

Lake Debar

Zalli

Drin (Albania)

Great Drin (Albania)

Bojana/Buna (Albania and Montenegro)

Drin settlements
Drin settlements